Jalan Perindustrian Kapar–Meru, Federal Route 3217 (formerly Selangor state route B2 and B1), is an industrial federal road in Selangor, Malaysia.

At most sections, the Federal Route 3217 was built under the JKR R5 road standard, with a speed limit of 90 km/h.

List of interchanges and junctions

References

Malaysian Federal Roads